Río Pascua Airport,  is an airport serving small settlements along the Pascua River in the Aysén Region of Chile.

There is mountainous terrain in all quadrants. The runway is aligned northwest with the lowest terrain routing.

See also

Transport in Chile
List of airports in Chile

References

External links
OpenStreetMap - Río Pascua Airport
OurAirports - Río Pascua Airport
SkyVector - Río Pascua Airport
FallingRain - Río Pascua Airport

Bing Maps - Río Pascua

Airports in Chile
Airports in Aysén Region